Camila Banus (born July 22, 1990) is an American actress. She is best known for her role as Gabi Hernandez on the soap opera Days of Our Lives from October 4, 2010, to June 12, 2014; Banus returned for brief appearances on December 22 and 29, 2014. Banus reprised her role as Gabi again, beginning September 17, 2015. Banus also played the character of Lola Montez on One Life to Live from October 2008 to May 2009. She had a regular role in the Fox TV show Star in the third season.

Personal life
Banus was born in Miami Beach, Florida. She is the oldest daughter of Carmen and Jaime Banus. She has a younger sister, Gabriela, who is also an actress. She is of Spanish and Cuban descent.

Filmography

Film

Television

Awards and nominations

References

External links
https://www.tvguide.com/tvshows/star/cast/836833/ (2018)

1990 births
Living people
People from Miami Beach, Florida
Hispanic and Latino American actresses
American people of Cuban descent
American people of Spanish descent
American soap opera actresses
21st-century American women